Christian Gabriel Ledru Macari (born February 8, 1980) is a French music video director and producer from the French West Indies. Through his company, Tchimbé Raid Production, he has released more than 50 videos of Hip Hop, RnB, Reggae-Dancehall and Zouk since 2006. He was honoured in 2008 at the Paris Olympia for his production of Le Combat Continue 3 by Kery James. He is active on the French Hip Hop scene.

He undertook a career in direction and production, and has worked with artists such as Snoop Dogg, Bushido, Fler, Booba, Damani, Kery James, La Fouine, Mac Tyer, Mokobé, Soprano, Rim'K, Sefyu, Rohff, Nessbeal, Casey, Despo, Soprano, 113,  Princess Lover, Tina,  Ali Angel, and Tony Parker.

Style 
Influenced during his youth by Spike Lee, Hype Williams, Chris Robinson, Ridley Scott, Tony Scott, Martin Scorsese, John Singleton and actors such as Denzel Washington and Samuel L. Jackson, Macari has a style described as dark, with original cinematographic touches.

Awards 
Macari won the award of Best Hip Hop Video in 2008 at the Olympia for the second sequel of "Les Trophées de l’Année du Hip Hop” for "Le Combat Continue 3" by Kery James He was the winner of the RFO contest "Best Short Movie Amateur" in 2003 for his movie Tchimbe Raid.

Personal life
Macari was born in the Val de Marne in France, and left with his parents for Martinique two weeks after his birth. He grew up on Martinique, first in Carbet, and then in Shcoelcher. He was educated in the capital city, Fort-de-France. He went to Ernest Renan Secondary School and to Victor Schoelcher High School. He graduated with an A-level in economics in 1998, and went to Paris for graphic art studies at the Grande Ecole of ESAG Penninghen, obtaining a diploma with honours in 2003.

Videography 
 April 2014: "Level" - Fler
 April 2014: "Une vie" - Booba
 November 2013: "Parlons Peu" - Booba
 October 2013: "63" - Kaaris
 September 2013 : "RTC" - Booba
 August 2013: "High Heels" - Fler featuring Jihad and Animus
 June 2013 : "Turfu" - Booba
 May 2013 : "Chrome" - Fler
 October 2012 : "Hinter blauen Augen" - Fler
 September 2012 : "Caramel" - Booba
 September 2012 : "Nummer Eins" - Fler
 August 2012 : "Vlog Geneve La Reunion" - Booba
 July 2012 : "Zoe Bras/Zoe In Me" - Gato Da Bato
 July 2012 : "Vlog La Guadeloupe Montreal" - Booba
 June 2012 : "Scarface Remix" - Tyla
 May 2012 : "A4" - Booba
 May 2012 : "Ni++er" - Mac Tyer featuring Despo'Rutti
 April 2012 : "Vlog Congo Part.2" - Booba
 April 2012 : "Casque Integral" - Dosseh & Kozi
 April 2012 : "Vlog Congo Part.1" - Booba
 March 2012 :" Classico" - Rim'K
 February 2012 : "Portrait Robot" - Rim K
 February 2012 : "Dans Ton Kwaah" - Niro
 Décember 2011 : "Corner" de Gato Da Bato Featuring Booba
 Décember 2011 : "Hors Catégorie" - Niro
 Décember 2011 : "Vaisseau Mère" - Booba
 November 2011 : "Gingerwine" - Nessbeal
 November 2011 : "La nébuleuse des aigles" - Nessbeal featuring Isleym
 November 2011 : "Africa Shootez Ballon(Official Song of the CAN Orange 2012)" - Jon Loo K
 November 2011 : "Paname" - Booba
 October 2011 : "Ce N'Etait Pas Le Deal" - Mac Tyer
 October 2011 : "Cruella" - Shay featuring Booba 
 October 2011 : "Gunshot" - Nessbeal
 October 2011 : "Bakel City Gang" - Booba
 August 2011 : "L'histoire d'un mec qui coule" - Nessbeal
June 2011: "Comme Une Etoile" - Booba
April 2011: "Régime Militaire" - Abou2ner
April 2011: " Killer" – Booba
April 2011: "Le Legiste" – Kaaris
April 2011: "Leader" – OGB ft IAM & Mafia K'1 Fry
March 2011: "Saddam Hauts de Seine" – Booba
January 2011: "Abracadabra" – Booba
December 2010: "On pense a vous" – 113 ft Amel Bent
November 2010: "Ma Couleur" – Booba
October 2010: "Jour De Paye" – Booba
October 2010: "Chez Nous" – Les Associés
October 2010: "Weg eines Kriegers" – Berlins Most Wanted
September 2010: "Berlins Most Wanted" – Berlins Most Wanted
September 2010: "Caesar Palace" – Booba
August 2010: "Mali Debout" – Mokobe
July 2010: "Dinguerie" – 113
June 2010: "Golo" – La Comera
June 2010: "Ca Chante" – SMOD
June 2010: "Lamborghini" – Green
May 2010: "Nu Lajan" – Gato Da Bato Feat Booba
May 2010: "Dangeroots" – Despo Rutti
April 2010: "Tony A Tué Manny" – Mac Tyer
April 2010: "Redemption" – Despo Rutti
April 2010: "Viser La Victoire" – Admiral T feat Medine & La Fouine
Mars 2010: "Chacun Son Vice" – Alonzo (feat. Ekila)
March 2010: "Ca Bouge Pas" – Nessbeal
March 2010: "Here Comes Damani" – Damani Feat. Snoop Dogg
March 2010: "So" (directed in December 2006) – Mac Tyer
March 2010: "Créature Ratée" – Casey
February 2010: "Foetus" – Booba
February 2010: "Braquage Vocal" – Alonzo
December 2009: "Banlieue Sale" – La Fouine (Feat.Nessbeal)
December 2009: "Je suis le quartier" – Alonzo
November 2009: "Krav Maga" – La Fouine
October 2009: "Rats Des Villes" – Booba
June 2009: "Double Poney" – Booba
June 2009: "Bande A Part" – Mala
May 2009: "Sévère" – Rohff
May 2009: "We We We" – Seth Gueko
April 2009: "Le Son Des Capuches" – Seth Gueko
March 2009: "Amnezia" – Nessbeal
March 2009: "Truc De Ouf" – Kennedy
February 2009: "Game Over" – Booba
February 2009: "Mauvais Œil Dans Le Périmètre" – Mac Tyer
January 2009: "Aigle Royal" – Dosseh
January 2009: "Discret" – AP
December 2008: "Rap Game" – Rohff
November 2008: "Progress" – Rohff ft Junior Reid
October 2008: "Ghetto Boyz/Vroum Vroum" – Mac Tyer
July 2008: "Terrain Vague" Rim K
June 2008: "Le Loup Dans La Bergerie" – Nessbeal
June 2008: "On Aime ca" – Nessbeal
April 2008: "RSC (rois sans couronne)" – Nessbeal
March 2008: "Hustler" – Krys (ft. Vybz Kartel + Aidonia)
February 2008: "Dernière Chance" – Lea Castel (ft. Soprano)
February 2008: "Laisse Moi Dans Mon Bunker" – Fat Taf (ft. Despo'Rutti)
January 2008: "Parloir Fantôme" – Rim K ft. Sefyu
December 2007: "Clandestino" – Rim K
November 2007: "Le Combat Continue part III" – Kery James
October 2007: "Safari" – Mokobe
September 2007: "L'Espoir des Favelas" – Rim K
July 2007: "Elle M'Envie" – Princess Lover
July 2007: "Mon Soleil (New Version)" – Princess Lover
May 2007: "Paroles de Soninke" – Mokobe, 113
March 2007: "Balance Toi" – Tony Parker
January 2007: "Chez Moi" – Casey
November 2006: "Bolides" – Despo Rutti
October 2006: "Vini" – Tina
September 2006: "Please Love Me" – Marco Polo
June 2006: "9.3. Tu Peux Pas Test" – Mac Tyer
June 2006: "Emeutiers" – Insurrection
May 2006: "Cliches" – Mac Kregor
April 2006: "Ali & Marisa" – Lovely
April 2006: "Trafic de Stereotypes" – Despo Rutti
April 2006: "Stop" – Hiroshimaa
January 2006: "7eme Ciel" – Jamice
January 2006: "Fermes Tes Yeux" – 2 Wayz
December 2005: "Juste Nous" – Ali Angel
October 2005: "Snake Me" – Warren
October 2005: "Je te Donne" – Warren
September 2005: "Vitry Nocturne" – 113
June 2005: – "Ailleurs" West Isle
March/April 2005: "On Ira Bien" – LS
February/March 2005: "Rap & Biz" – Weedy
January/February 2005: "Invincible" – O.G Plasm
January 2005: "Madd Thing" – Madd Youths Records
September 2004: "Pa meny.. Mwen" – Tendance 09 vol.1
September 2005/April 2006: "Morgane de Clara" – Clara Morgane
December 2004: school film for Supinfo – Institute of Information Technology
August 2004: "Je Doute" – Tendance 09 vol.1
August 2004: "Dommage" – Tendance 09 vol.1
2003: "The Letter" – Tchimbe Raid Production

References

External links 
Official website of Chris Macari
My Space Official
Facebook Official

French music video directors
1980 births
Living people
People from Créteil
French people of Martiniquais descent